Gisèle Casadesus (14 June 1914 – 24 September 2017) was a French actress, who appeared in numerous theatre and film productions. She was an honorary member of the Sociétaires of the Comédie-Française, Grand Officer of the Legion of Honor, Officer of the Ordre des Arts et des Lettres, and Grand-Croix of the National Order of Merit. In a career spanning more than 80 years, Casadesus appeared in more than a dozen films after turning 90.

Life and career 
Born into a family of artists in the 18th arrondissement of Paris, Gisèle was the daughter of musician, composer and conductor Henri Casadesus and harpist Marie-Louise Beetz, her older brother was actor Christian Casadesus. After receiving first prize in acting at French National Academy of Dramatic Arts at the age of twenty, Casadeus joined the Comédie-Française in 1934. The same year, she married the actor Lucien Pascal (born Lucien Probst), with whom she had four children: Jean-Claude (1935), Martine (1939), Béatrice (1942) and Dominique (1954), all artists. She became the 400th member of the Comédie-Française on 1 January 1939, and honorary member on 15 April 1967.

In cinema, Pierre Billon hired her in 1943 to play the role of Clotilde Grandlieus in Vautrin, adapted from Balzac's novel, alongside Michel Simon, and in 1946 for the role of Mary in L'Homme au chapeau rond, alongside Raimu.

In 1971 she was Countess Eguzon in La Belle Aventure, participated in Le Mouton enragé by Michel Deville, played the role of Nicole Leguen, wife of Jean Gabin in Verdict (1974) by André Cayatte, and the mother of Claude Jade in Les Robots pensants (1976).

Again with Claude Jade, she was Mamie Rose (1976), the "grand-mère au pair" in the film by Pierre Goutas, her greatest role. It is followed by her Catherine in Un crime de notre temps (1977) by Gabriel Axel. Claude Lelouch engaged her in 1996 for the role of Clara Blanc, mother of Bernard Tapie, in Hommes, femmes, mode d'emploi. In Aïe (2000), she is the mother of André Dussollier, and in Valérie Lemercier's comedy Palais Royal (2005) she plays the queen mother. She was Margueritte ("with two ts") alongside Gérard Depardieu in Jean Becker's My Afternoons with Margueritte (2010).

Later role and award honours 
In 2013, aged 99, Casadesus acted alongside Anne Consigny and Marie Kremer in Sous le figuier directed by Anne-Marie Étienne. Casadesus was awarded Grand Officer of the Legion of Honour on 29 March 2013.

She was also an Officer of the Ordre des Arts et des Lettres, and Grand-Croix of the National Order of Merit. She received an Honorary Molière Award in 2003 for her entire career.

Death 
Casadesus died in Paris, France, at the age of 103.

Theatre

At Comédie-Française 

 1934: Lorenzaccio by Alfred de Musset, directed by Émile Fabre
 1934: La Brebis by Edmond See, directed by Jean Debucourt
 1934: On ne badine pas avec l'amour by Alfred de Musset
 1934: Le Mariage forcé by Molière, directed by Robert Manuel
 1934: Le Sourire du faune by André Rivoire, directed by Pierre Bertin
 1934: Le Médecin malgré lui by Molière
 1934: Ruy Blas by Victor Hugo
 1934: La Belle aventure by Gaston Arman de Caillavet, Robert de Flers and Étienne Rey
 1934: L'Amour veille by Gaston Arman de Caillavet and Robert de Flers
 1934: Tante Marie by Anne Valray, directed by Charles Granval
 1934: Le Barbier de Séville by Beaumarchais
 1935: Le Mariage de Figaro by Beaumarchais
 1935: L'Impromptu de Versailles by Molière
 1935: Les Burgraves by Victor Hugo
 1935: L'Étourdi ou les Contretemps by Molière
 1935: L'Illustre théâtre by Jules Truffier; directed by Pierre Bertin
 1935: Madame Quinze by Jean Sarment, directed by Émile Fabre
 1935: Sur la lisière d'un bois by Victor Hugo
 1935: Les Fourberies de Scapin by Molière
 1935: L'Arlésienne by Alphonse Daudet
 1935: Paraître by Maurice Donnay
 1936: L'Embuscade by Henry Kistemaeckers
 1936: Le Sang de Danton by Saint-Georges de Bouhélier; directed by Léon Bernard
 1936: Les Noces d'argent by Paul Géraldy
 1936: Le Chant du berceau by Gregorio and Maria Martinez Sierra; directed by Émile Fabre
 1936: Le Voyage à Biarritz by Jean Sarment; directed by André Brunot
 1936: Les Rivaux d'eux-mêmes by Pigault-Lebrun; directed by Jean Martinelli
 1936: Un caprice by Alfred de Musset, directed by Maurice Escande
 1936: La Nouvelle idole by François de Curel
 1936: Bolivar by Jules Supervielle; music by Darius Milhaud, choreography by Serge Lifar, directed by Émile Fabre
 1936: Le Bon Roi Dagobert by André Rivoire
 1936: Martine by Jean-Jacques Bernard
 1937: Asmodée by François Mauriac; directed by Jacques Copeau
 1937: La Marche nuptiale by Henry Bataille
 1937: Le Jeu de l'amour et du hasard by Marivaux; directed by Maurice Escande
 1937: Le Monde où l'on s'ennuie by Édouard Pailleron
 1937: L'Impromptu de Versailles by Molière, directed by Pierre Dux
 1937: À quoi rêvent les jeunes filles by Alfred de Musset; directed by Charles Granval
 1937: Les Corbeaux by Henry Becque
 1937: Le Légataire universel by Jean-François Regnard, directed by Pierre Dux
 1937: L'Illusion comique by Pierre Corneille, directed by Louis Jouvet
 1937: Le Bonhomme jadis by Henri Murger
 1937: Le Dépit amoureux by Molière
 1938: La Seconde Surprise de l'amour by Marivaux, directed by Pierre Bertin
 1938: Tricolore by Pierre Lestringuez, musique Darius Milhaud, directed by Louis Jouvet
 1938: Cantique des cantiques by Jean Giraudoux; directed by Louis Jouvet
 1938: Les Femmes savantes by Molière
 1938: La Dispute by Marivaux; directed by Jean Martinelli
 1938: Un chapeau de paille d'Italie by Eugène Labiche and Marc-Michel, directed by Gaston Baty
 1938: Le Menteur by Pierre Corneille, directed by Pierre Bertin
 1938: La Coupe enchantée by Jean de La Fontaine and Champmeslé, directed by André Bacqué
 1938: Esther by Jean Racine; directed by Georges Le Roy
 1939: A souffert sous Ponce Pilate by Paul Raynal; directed by René Alexandre
 1939: Les Trois Henry by André Lang
 1939: Les affaires sont les affaires by Octave Mirbeau
 1939: Ruy Blas by Victor Hugo; directed by Pierre Dux
 1939: La Belle Aventure by Gaston Arman de Caillavet, Robert de Flers and Étienne Rey
 1940: L'Âne de Buridan by Gaston Arman de Caillavet and Robert de Flers; directed by Pierre Bertin
 1940: Les Fausses Confidences by Marivaux; directed by Pierre Dux
 1941: Les Précieuses ridicules by Molière; directed by André Brunot
 1941: La Gageure imprévue by Michel-Jean Sedaine; directed by Pierre Bertin
 1941: Noé by André Obey; directed by Pierre Bertin
 1941: Le Beau Léandre by Théodore de Banville and Paul Siraudin, directed by Denis d'Inès
 1941: Tartuffe ou l'Imposteur by Molière; directed by Pierre Bertin
 1942: Le Cheval arabe by Julien Luchaire; directed by Jean Debucourt
 1942: La Paix chez soi by Georges Courteline
 1942: Le Distrait by Jean-François Regnard; directed by Jean Meyer
 1942: Le Misanthrope by Molière; directed by Jacques Copeau
 1942: La Gageure imprévue by Michel-Jean Sedaine; directed by Pierre Bertin
 1943: La Reine morte by Henry de Montherlant; directed by Pierre Dux
 1943: Un jour by Francis Jammes
 1943: Le Barbier de Séville by Beaumarchais, directed by Pierre Dux
 1943: Le Sicilien ou l'Amour peintre by Molière; directed by Maurice Escande
 1944: Barberine by Alfred de Musset, directed by Jean Meyer
 1945: Une visite de noces by Alexandre Dumas fils
 1945: L'Avare by Molière; directed by Jean Meyer
 1946: Le Mariage de Figaro by Beaumarchais; directed by Jean Meyer
 1946: La Princesse d'Élide by Molière; directed by Georges Le Roy
 1946: Feu la mère de madame by Georges Feydeau; directed by Fernand Ledoux
 1948: L'Ami Fritz by Émile Erckmann and Alexandre Chatrian
 1948: L'Épreuve by Marivaux; directed by Julien Bertheau
 1948: Le Gendre de M. Poirier by Émile Augier and Jules Sandeau
 1949: On ne saurait penser à tout by Alfred de Musset; directed by Robert Manuel
 1950: La Belle aventure by Gaston Arman de Caillavet, Robert de Flers and Étienne Rey; directed by Jean Debucourt
 1950: Les Fausses Confidences by Marivaux; directed by Maurice Escande
 1951: Sganarelle ou le Cocu imaginaire by Molière; directed by Jacques Clancy
 1951: Le Chevalier Canepin by Henri Duvernois; directed by Jacques Charon
 1951: Le Dindon by Georges Feydeau; directed by Jean Meyer
 1951: L'Indigent by Charles Vildrac; directed by Georges Chamarat
 1952: La Coupe enchantée by Jean de La Fontaine and Champmeslé; directed by Jacques Clancy
 1952: Le Légataire universel by Jean-François Régnard; directed by Pierre Dux
 1952: Les Précieuses ridicules by Molière; directed by Robert Manuel
 1953: Le Menteur by Corneille; directed by Denis d'Inès
 1953: Le Dépit amoureux by Molière; directed by Georges Chamarat
 1953: Le Jeu de l'amour et du hasard by Marivaux; directed by Maurice Escande
 1954: L'Épreuve by Marivaux; directed by Julien Bertheau
 1954: Le Menteur by Pierre Corneille; directed by Denis d'Ines
 1955: Est-il bon ? Est-il méchant? by Denis Diderot; directed by Henri Rollan
 1957: La Bonne Mère by Florian; directed by Maurice Escande
 1957: L'Ours by Anton Chekhov; directed by André Falcon
 1958: Un ami de jeunesse by Edmond See, directed by Denis d'Inès
 1958: La Maison de campagne by Florent Carton Dancourt, directed by Hélène Perdrière
 1958: On ne saurait penser à tout by Alfred de Musset, directed by Robert Manuel
 1958: Le Misanthrope by Molière, directed by Pierre Dux
 1959: Les Trente Millions de Gladiator by Eugène Labiche; directed by Jean Meyer
 1960: Chacun sa vérité by Luigi Pirandello; directed by Charles Dullin
 1961: On ne saurait penser à tout by Alfred de Musset; directed by Robert Manuel
 1962: La Troupe du Roy by Molière; directed by Paul-Émile Deiber
 1980: La Folle de Chaillot by Jean Giraudoux; directed by Michel Fagadau
 1990: Tête de poulet by Spiro, lecture
 2011: Le Jubilé d'Agathe by Pascal Lainé, lecture, Studio-Théâtre de la Comédie-Française

Outside Comédie-Française 

 Une petite qui voit grand by Germaine Acremant
 Boubouroche by Georges Courteline
 J'y suis j'y reste by Raymond Vincy and Jean Valmy
 Le Bal des voleurs by Jean Anouilh
 Le Rendez-vous de Senlis by Jean Anouilh
 Histoire de rire by Armand Salacrou
 Une femme libre by Armand Salacrou
 Monsieur chasse ! by Georges Feydeau
 Bonne chance Denis by Michel Duran
 Le Complexe de Philémon by Jean Bernard-Luc
 Caroline a disparu by Jean Valmy and André Haguet
 Les Œufs de l'autruche by André Roussin
 Teddy and partner by Yvan Noé
 Hyménée by Édouard Bourdet
 And Then There Were None by Agatha Christie
 La Voyante by André Roussin
 Le Chantier by Charles Tordjman
 1965: Lorsque l'enfant paraît by André Roussin, directed by the author, théâtre des Célestins
 1967: Lorsque l'enfant paraît by André Roussin, directed by the author, théâtre Saint-Georges
 1968: La Courte Paille by Jean Meyer, directed by the author, tournée
 1969: Monsieur chasse ! by Georges Feydeau, directed by Alain Feydeau, Grand Théâtre de Limoges
 1974: Ce formidable bordel ! by Eugène Ionesco, directed by Jacques Mauclair, théâtre des Célestins
 1980: Fin de partie by Samuel Beckett, directed by Guy Rétoré, théâtre de l'Est parisien
 1982: Fin de partie by Samuel Beckett, directed by Guy Rétoré, théâtre Renaud-Barrault
 1987: Entre passions et prairie by Denise Bonal, directed by Guy Rétoré, théâtre de l'Est parisien
 1988: Le Vallon by Agatha Christie, directed by Simone Benmussa, théâtre Renaud-Barrault
 1989: Clair de terre by Daniel Besnehard, directed by Guy Rétoré, théâtre de l'Est parisien
 1992: Le Jugement dernier by Bernard-Henri Lévy, directed by Jean-Louis Martinelli, théâtre de l'Atelier
 1993: Le Retour en Touraine by Françoise Dorin, directed by Georges Wilson, théâtre de l'Œuvre
 1995: Savannah Bay by Marguerite Duras, directed by Jean-Claude Amyl, théâtre national de Chaillot
 1997: Le Bonheur à Romorantin by Jean-Claude Brisville, directed by Jean-Luc Tardieu, Espace 44 Nantes
 1999: Savannah Bay by Marguerite Duras, directed by Jean-Claude Amyl, théâtre du Rond-Point, et en tournée jusqu'en 2001
 2003: À chacun sa vérité by Luigi Pirandello, directed by Bernard Murat, Centre national de création d'Orléans, théâtre Antoine
 2005: Richard III by William Shakespeare, directed by Didier Long, La Coursive La Rochelle

Filmography

Cinema 

 1934: L'Aventurier by Marcel L'Herbier: Geneviève
 1934: Un soir à la Comédie-Française by Léonce Perret: herself
 1943: Graine au vent by Maurice Gleize: Germaine
 1943: Vautrin by Pierre Billon: Clotilde de Grandlieu
 1944: Coup de tête by René Le Hénaff: Nadine
 1945: Pamela by Pierre de Hérain: Joséphine de Beauharnais
 1946: L'Homme au chapeau rond by Pierre Billon: Marie
 1947: Les Aventures de Casanova by Jean Boyer: Geneviève de Cerlin
 1948: Route sans issue by Jean Stelli: Simone Fournier
 1949: Between Eleven and Midnight by Henri Decoin: Florence
 1949: Du Guesclin by Bernard de Latour: Jeanne, Countess of Penthièvre
 1974: Verdict by André Cayatte: Nicole Leguen
 1974: Le Mouton enragé by Michel Deville
 1975: Ma Mie Rose by Pierre Goutas: Mamie Rose
 1976: Le Collectionneur de cerveaux by Michel Subiela: Mme Vanderwood
 1976: Un mari, c'est un mari by Serge Friedman: Senator
 1976: Une femme fidèle by Roger Vadim: Countess Lapalimmes
 1977: Un oursin dans la poche by Roger Vadim: Benjamin's mother
 1984: Opéra des ombres, Berlioz 1864 by Georges Combes
 1988: Sweet Lies by Nathalie Delon: Nemo
 1988: Un été d'orages by Charlotte Brandström: grandmother
 1990: Cinématon (épisode 1342) by Gérard Courant: herself
 1990: Couple (épisode 76) by Gérard Courant: herself
 1993: Roulez jeunesse! by Jacques Fansten: Bernadette
 1996: Hommes, femmes, mode d'emploi by Claude Lelouch: Clara Blanc
 1996: Album de famille, court métrage by Shéri Tsur: Geneviève
 1997: Riches, belles, etc. by Bunny Schpoliansky
 1997: Post coïtum animal triste by Brigitte Roüan
 1999: The Children of the Marshland by Jean Becker: Mme Mercier
 1999: La Dilettante by Pascal Thomas :
 2000: Aïe by Sophie Fillières: Robert's mother
 2001: Deux vieilles dames et l'accordeur, short film by Guillaume Canet
 2001: J'me souviens plus, short film by Alain Doutey: Rose
 2002: C'est le bouquet ! by Jeanne Labrune: the lady
 2004: Le Promeneur du Champs-de-Mars by Robert Guédiguian: Simone Picard's sister
 2005: Palais Royal ! by Valérie Lemercier: Alma, The Queen Mother
 2005: Le Noël de Lily, short film by Éric Nebot: Lily
 2005: Travaux, on sait quand ça commence... by Brigitte Roüan
 2006: Le Grand Appartement by Pascal Thomas: Grandmother Joséphine
 2007: Le Quatrième Morceau de la femme coupée en trois by Laure Marsac: the old lady
 2009: Le Premier Cercle by Laurent Tuel: Mme Malakian
 2009: Kankant, short film by François Grandjacques
 2009: Le Hérisson by Mona Achache: Mme de Broglie
 2010: Porteur d'hommes, short film by Antarès Bassis
 2010: My Afternoons with Margueritte by Jean Becker: Margueritte
 2010: What War May Bring by Claude Lelouch: Ilva, 95 years old
 2010: Sarah's Key by Gilles Paquet-Brenner: Mamé
 2012: Le Jeu de cette famille by Aytl Jensen: Berthe
 2013: Sous le figuier by Anne-Marie Etienne: Selma
 2014: Weekends in Normandy by Anne Villacèque: Françoise

Television 

1966: :fr:Les Compagnons de Jéhu (mini-série) (in French), directed by Michel Drach: Louise de Montrevel

2001: Maigret Chez Le Ministre, Maigret and the Minister (Sn7 Ep2) directed by Christian de Chalonge: Mme Calame

Bibliography

See also 

 Casadesus
 List of centenarians (actors, filmmakers and entertainers)

References

External links 

 
 The Casadesus Family 
 Gisèle Casadesus at the Comédie-Française

1914 births
2017 deaths
French centenarians
Actresses from Paris
Sociétaires of the Comédie-Française
Grand Officiers of the Légion d'honneur
French stage actresses
French film actresses
French television actresses
20th-century French actresses
21st-century French actresses
Gisele
Women centenarians